= Adolfo Elizaincín =

Uruguayan scholar and linguist

Adolfo Esteban Elizaincín Eichenberger (born 9 December 1944 in Montevideo) is a Uruguayan scholar and linguist.

== Publications ==
- Atlas lingüístico diatópico y diastrático del Uruguay (ADDU), Vol. 1 (with Harald Thun). Kiel: Westensee Verlag, 2000
- El español en la Banda Oriental en el siglo XVIII (with Marisa Malcuori and Virginia Bertolotti). Montevideo: Facultad de Humanidades y Ciencias de la Educación, 1997
- Sociolinguistics in Argentina, Paraguay and Uruguay (ed.). Berlin: Mouton/De Gruyter, 1996
- Análisis del discurso. V Jornadas Interdisciplinarias de Lingüística. Montevideo 1987 (Comp., with Irene Madfes). Montevideo: Facultad de Humanidades y Ciencias de la Educación, 1994
- El español de América. Cuadernos bibliográficos. Argentina. Paraguay. Uruguay (with Nélida Esther Donni de Mirande, Germán de Granda Gutiérrez, Magdalena Coll). Madrid: Arco Libros, 1994
- Dialectos en contacto. Español y portugués en España y América. Montevideo: Arca, 1992
- Nos Falemo brasilero. Dialectos portugueses en Uruguay (with Luis Ernesto Behares and Graciela Barrios). Montevideo: Amesur, 1987
- Temas de Psico- y Sociolingüística (with Luis Ernesto Behares). Montevideo: Facultad de Humanidades y Ciencias, 1981
- Estudios sobre el español del Uruguay. I. Montevideo: Universidad de la República, 1981
- Bilingüismo en la Cuenca del Plata. Montevideo: OEA/OAS, 1975.
